1856 Cumberland (North Riding) colonial by-election may refer to 

 1856 Cumberland (North Riding) colonial by-election 1 held in June 1856
 1856 Cumberland (North Riding) colonial by-election 2 held in October 1856

See also
 List of New South Wales state by-elections